The globulomaxillary cyst is a cyst that appears between a maxillary lateral incisor and the adjacent canine. It exhibits as an "inverted pear-shaped radiolucency" on radiographs, or X-ray films.

The globulomaxillary cyst often causes the roots of adjacent teeth to diverge.

This cyst should not be confused with a nasopalatine cyst.

The developmental origin has been disputed.  Today, most literature agree based on overwhelming evidence that the cyst is predominantly of tooth origin (odontogenic), demonstrating findings consistent with periapical cysts, odontogenic keratocysts or lateral periodontal cysts.

Treatment
Treatment is usually by enucleation.

References

Cysts of the oral and maxillofacial region